The Domestic Abuse Act 2021 is an Act of Parliament of the United Kingdom. The act included provisions necessary to ratify the Istanbul Convention. Much of the content within the Act is still much debated. The Act is intended to help tackle domestic violence in the United Kingdom, which has been referred to as a "silent epidemic." There have been numerous suggestions to address the Act's protection of victims of domestic violence. The United Kingdom has also received criticism for taking eight years to carry out commitments following the Istanbul Convention.

The Act

Definitions 
The Act created the first statutory definition of domestic abuse to ensure that "domestic abuse is properly understood, considered unacceptable and actively challenged across statutory agencies and in public attitudes." The Act has created a genderless, broad definition which has not greatly expanded on the pre-existing cross-governmental definition.

The definition is described in Section 1, which states that the behaviour must be "abusive" and the parties involved must be "personally connected" to each other. Section 1(3) describes abusive behaviour as: "physical or sexual abuse; violent or threatening behaviour; controlling or coercive behaviour; economic abuse; psychological, emotional or other abuse; and it does not matter whether the behaviour consists of a single incident or a course of conduct." Section 2 describes relationships which are "personally connected" to each other, which includes relationships where the parties have been or are married, engaged, civil partners, in a relationship, or are related.

This definition has come under criticism by charities preventing violence against women predominantly due to the genderless approach that it has taken. Women are not recognized by the Act as being disproportionately affected by domestic abuse in Britain. Statistics across various sectors and identity groups demonstrate that women are experience higher rates of domestic abuse than men due to historical and "patriarchal dynamics surrounding the use of violence." The Government justified this decision to "ensure that all victims and all types of domestic abuse are sufficiently captured."

Children 
The Act defines a child who witness domestic abuse as victims of abuse. This recognize the detrimental effects of children experiencing domestic abuse within the home and how they are classed as the "invisible victims." Section 3 defines "Children as victims of domestic abuse" as an individual under 18 years who "sees or hears, or experiences the effects of the abuse" and is related to both or one of the parties.

Domestic Abuse Protection Orders 
The Domestic Abuse Act 2021 created a new Domestic Abuse Protection Order ('DAPO') and Notice ('DAPN') which aims to unify the current protection orders within the UK. This is following aims to offer "maximum protection to all victims" of domestic violence in the UK in order to prevent the violence from recurring in the home.

The United Kingdom currently recognizes four protection orders for victims of domestic abuse: Occupation Orders, Non-molestation Orders, Restraining Orders and Domestic Violence Protection Orders. There is confusion surrounding when these orders apply and what conditions they can impose, with DAPOs and DAPNs seek to address. The new DAPO and DAPN aims to replace the old Domestic Violence Protection Notices and Domestic Violence Protection Orders.

DAPO and DAPN are currently at pilot stage in order to "assess the effectiveness and impact of the new model prior to national roll out."

Domestic Abuse Commissioner 
The Act creates a new branch of Government called the Domestic Abuse Commissioner. Their role is to laid out in Part 2, which states that their general function include "good practice in - the prevention of domestic abuse; the prevention, detection, investigation and prosecution of offences involving domestic abuse; the identification of people who carry out domestic abuse, victims of domestic abuse and children affected by domestic abuse; and the provision of protection and support to people affected by domestic abuse." The Commissioner is an independent branch to provide the Government with "independent and objective advice which can be relief upon by statutory agencies and the voluntary sector alike."

Cross-examination and domestic abuse 
The act includes provisions to prevent cross-examination by those who have been found guilty of certain offences against another, or an injunction for certain actions which the other party has been given the opportunity to challenge for certain actions has been granted, of where there is other evidence for domestic abuse. This applies to criminal proceedings,civil proceedings,  and family court.

References

External links
Full text of the Domestic Abuse Act 2021

Child abuse legislation
Child abuse in the United Kingdom
Violence against women in the United Kingdom
Women's rights in the United Kingdom
Family law in the United Kingdom
United Kingdom Acts of Parliament 2021
2021 in British law